Desis may refer to:
 Desi, referring to the Indian subcontinent or South Asia
 One of a type of List of surgical procedures (such as Arthrodesis, Epiphysiodesis, Pleurodesis)
Desis (spider), a genus of intertidal spiders

See also
Desi (disambiguation)